Merz is a German surname. Notable people with the surname include:

 Aaron Merz (b. 1983), US football player
 Albert Merz (?-1941), One of 3 German brothers (w August and Rudolf) who were imprisoned in Nazi Germany for refusing to bear arms. He was executed. 
 Alessia Merz (b. 1974), Italian television personality
 Anna Merz (1931–2013), English conservationist
 Annette Merz (fl. 1990s), German Protestant theologian, biblical scholar
 Alfred Merz (1880–1925), Austrian-German oceanologist
 Bruno Merz (b. 1976), New Zealand-born musician, composer, working in Netherlands
 Charles Hesterman Merz (1874–1940), Pioneer of the National Grid UK
 Charlie Merz (1888–1952) US racecar driver
 Curt Merz (b. 1938), US football player
 Friedrich Merz (b. 1955), German politician (CDU)
 Georg Merz (1793-1867), German optical instruments manufacturer
 Hans-Rudolf Merz (b. 1942), President of Switzerland (2009)
 HG Merz (b. 1947), German architect, museum designer 
 Ivan Merz (1896–1928), blessed, Croatian Catholic lay activist
 Joachim Merz (b. 1948), German economist
 John Theodore Merz (1840-1922), English-born German chemist, historian, industrialist
 Jon F. Merz (fl. 1990s), US author
 Joseph Anton Merz (1681–1750), German painter
 Karl Spruner von Merz (1803-1892), German cartographer, scholar
 Klaus Merz (b. 1945), Swiss writer
 Louis L. Merz (1908-2002), Political figure in US state of Wisconsin
 Markus Merz, founder of software company OScar
 Mario Merz (1925–2003), Italian artist
 Marisa Merz (1928–2019), Italian sculptor, widow of Mario Merz
 Matthias Merz (b. 1984), Swiss mountaineer
 Mischa Merz (b. 1967), Australian boxer, painter, journalist
 Otto Merz (1889-1933), German racecar driver
 Robert Merz (1887-1914), Austrian football (soccer) player
 Sue Merz (b. 1972), US ice hockey player, Olympic athlete (1998)
 William Merz (1878-1946), US gymnast, Olympic athlete (1904)

See also
 Mertz, surname
 Mercier (disambiguation), includes a list of people with surname Mercier

German-language surnames